Family Life (US: Wednesday's Child) is a 1971 British drama film directed by Ken Loach from a screenplay by David Mercer. It is a remake of In Two Minds, an episode of the BBC's Wednesday Play series first transmitted by the BBC in March 1967, which was also written by Mercer and directed by Loach.

Plot
A young woman, Janice, is living with her conservative, working-class parents, who become concerned at her rebellious behaviour, and are shocked when she becomes pregnant. At a time when pregnancy and being unmarried were widely considered shameful, they insist she has an abortion, but this has terrible emotional and mental effects on her.  They constantly berate her for her behaviour, even when they visit her in hospital.

Cast

Production
Half the budget was provided by the National Film Finance Corporation the other half by Nat Cohen and Anglo-EMI. The film was screened at the New York Film Festival on 3 October 1972.

Awards

Won
1972 Berlin International Film Festival:
FIPRESCI Prize – Forum of New Film: Ken Loach
Interfilm Award – Forum of New Cinema: Ken Loach
OCIC Award – Forum of New Film: Ken Loach
French Syndicate of Cinema Critics 1974:
Critics Award – Best Foreign Film: Ken Loach (UK)
Sydney Film Festival 2003:
Audience Award – Best Feature-Length Fiction Film: Ken Loach

Nominated
BAFTA Awards 1973:
UN Award – Best Film

References

External links

1971 films
1971 drama films
Films about sexual repression
Films directed by Ken Loach
Films scored by Marc Wilkinson
British drama films
EMI Films films
Films about abortion
1970s English-language films
1970s British films